Canada is known to be one of the most accepting countries when it comes to LGBT rights. LGBT rights in Canada have been raising since the year of 1969 when same-sex sexual activities were legalized. Canada is also known to be very progressive when it comes to healthcare, as they are one of the leading countries in most accessible healthcare. 

The elected officials and politicians of Canada reflect the rights and laws that have been passed. The following is a list of openly LGBT politicians in Canada grouped by Senate, House of Commons, Provincial legislatures, Mayors, Municipal councilors, and other. There is information included about what Province they were elected in and from, what party they identify as, who they were nominated by, when their term began and ended (if it has), and any additional notes about the politician.

Senate

House of Commons

Provincial legislatures

Mayors

Municipal councillors

Other 
People who did not hold a political office at the federal, provincial or municipal levels, but have some other form of political significance.

References 

Canadian
LGBT